Layne Tom Jr. (born Richard Layne Tom, Jr.) (June 19, 1927 – January 14, 2015) was an American actor.

Career
He holds the distinction of having played three different Charlie Chan sons: as Charlie Chan Jr. in Charlie Chan at the Olympics (1937), as Tommy Chan in Charlie Chan in Honolulu (1938), and in 1940's Charlie Chan's Murder Cruise as Willie Chan, Chan's number seven son.

He also appeared with child star Shirley Temple in Stowaway (1936) as an uncredited Chinese Boy in the Musical Band. He was credited as Mako with Dorothy Lamour, Jon Hall, and C. Aubrey Smith in The Hurricane (1937), and as an uncredited extra in San Francisco (1936) with stars Clark Gable, Jeanette MacDonald, and Spencer Tracy.

Tom attended John H. Francis Polytechnic High School in Los Angeles.  After he got out of the Navy when World War II ended, he turned down a five-year movie contract with Monogram Pictures to attend the University of Southern California instead to become an architect.  He designed the flagship Bank of America building in Los Angeles' Chinatown, as well as fire stations, banks, courthouses, libraries, shopping centers, civic centers.

Tom only returned to show business to film two documentaries about Charlie Chan: Layne Tom, Jr: The Adventures of Charlie Chan, Jr. and Legacy of Charlie Chan as himself.

Personal Life and Death
Tom died in 2015 in his home in Huntington Beach, California, age 87.

His daughter Kiana Tom is a television host, star of Kiana's Flex Appeal fitness series and one of the most widely recognized fitness experts in the world.

Filmography

References

External links

 Obituary - Hollywood Reporter

American male film actors
1927 births
American people of Chinese descent
2015 deaths
20th-century American male actors